CTC may refer to:

Colleges
 Central Texas College, US
 Chattahoochee Technical College, Georgia, US
 Cincinnati Technical College, later Cincinnati State Technical and Community College, Ohio
 City Technology College, a type of English school

Companies 
 CTC (TV station), Australia
 CTC Media, owner of STS channel
 Calcutta Tramways Company, India
 Cambridge Temperature Concepts, a UK company
 Canadian Tire Centre, Ottawa, Ontario
 Canadian Tire Corporation, Toronto Stock Exchange symbol
 Ceylon Tobacco Company, Sri Lanka
 Chiba Television Broadcasting Corporation, Japan
 China Telecommunications Corporation
 Computer Terminal Corporation, former name of the US company Datapoint
 Crimson Trace Corporation, US company
 Itochu Techno-Solutions, a Japanese company
 The Contemporary Theater Company, US

Government
 California Commission on Teacher Credentialing, US
 California Transportation Commission
 Canadian Tourism Commission
 Canadian Transport Commission, former name of the Canadian Transportation Agency
 Child Tax Credit
 Combating Terrorism Center, an academic institution
 Continuous transaction control, also known as Transaction-Based Reporting
 Counter Terrorism Command, of the London Metropolitan Police
 Counter-Terrorism Committee, UN
 Counterterrorism Center, former name of the CIA Counterterrorism Mission Center

Science
 Circulating tumor cell, in the blood
 Closed timelike curve, in general relativity
 Common Toxicity Criteria, of cancer drugs
 Connectionist temporal classification, a type of neural network output
 CTC, a codon for the amino acid Leucine

Sports
 Cryme Tyme Cenation, a wrestling stable
 Cyclists' Touring Club, UK
 Royal Calcutta Turf Club

Technology
 Career and Technology Centre, Calgary, Alberta, Canada
 CBS Technology Center
 Centralized traffic control, used by railroads
 Clermont Transportation Connection, US
 Community technology center
 Cornell Theory Center, predecessor to Cornell University Center for Advanced Computing, US
 Connectionist temporal classification, a type of neural network output
 Counter/Timer Channel, a peripheral for the Zilog Z80 microprocessor

Other
 Canberra Theatre Centre, a performing arts centre in Canberra, Australia
 Central de Trabajadores de Cuba, the Workers' Central Union of Cuba
 Centre for Terrorism and Counterterrorism, now Institute of Security and Global Affairs (ISGA), The Hague, Netherlands
 Cinnamon Toast Crunch, a brand of breakfast cereal
 Combat Team Conference, a competition of military and law enforcement special operations units.
 Comcast Technology Center, the tallest building in Philadelphia and the Commonwealth of Pennsylvania.
 Communities That Care, program of the US Center for Substance Abuse Prevention
 Confederación de Trabajadores de Colombia, the Confederation of Workers of Colombia
 Continuous transaction control, also known as Transaction-Based Reporting
 Cost to company of an employee
 Cracking the Cryptic, a YouTube channel dedicated to paper-and-pencil puzzles, primarily sudoku
 Crush, tear, curl, or cut, tear, curl, a method of processing tea
 C.T.C., a Romanian hip hop band